This is list of notable alumni of St. Mary's University School of Law.

Judiciary 
Elma Salinas Ender, J.D. 1978, first Hispanic woman to serve on a state district court in Texas; Judge of the 341st Judicial District in Laredo from 1983 until her retirement in 2012
David Alan Ezra, J.D. 1972, District Judge, United States District Court for the District of Hawaii
Paul W. Green, J.D. 1977, Justice, Texas Supreme Court
Thad Heartfield, J.D. 1965, Chief Judge, United States District Court for the Eastern District of Texas
Kathleen Cardone, J.D. 1979, District Judge, United States District for the Western District of Texas
Barbara Hervey, J.D. 1979, Place 7 judge of the Texas Court of Criminal Appeals; first elected in 2000
Julie Kocurek, J.D. 1990, presiding judge of the 390th District Court in Travis County, Texas.
Marina Marmolejo, J.D. 1996, District Judge, United States District Court for the Southern District of Texas
Rose Spector, J.D. First woman elected, in 1992, to serve as a Justice of the Texas Supreme Court
Nelson W. Wolff, J.D. 1966, Judge, Bexar County Court, 2001–2018, Mayor of San Antonio, Texas (June 1, 1991 – June 1, 1995), Former Texas State Senator for Texas's 26th Senate District (1973–1975), Former Texas State Representative from Bexar County (1971–1973)

Elected officials 
John Cornyn, J.D. 1977, U.S. Senator from Texas since 2002; Senate Minority Whip since 2013; Former Justice of the Texas Supreme Court; 49th Attorney General of Texas (1999–2002)
Michael McCaul, J.D. 1987, U.S. Representative from Texas's 10th Congressional District
 Glenn Hegar, M.A. and J.D. 1997, Texas State Senator 2007–2014; Member of the Texas House from 2003 to 2007; elected Texas Comptroller of Public Accounts in 2014 State General Election
Carlos Uresti, J.D. 1992, Former Texas State Senator for Texas's 19th Senate District
Kika de la Garza, J.D. 1952, Former U.S. Representative for Texas's 15th Congressional District, former Chairman of House Agriculture Committee, Former Texas State Representative
Blake Farenthold, J.D. 1989, former U.S. Representative for Texas's 27th Congressional District
Charlie Gonzalez, J.D. 1972, Former U.S. Representative for Texas's 20th Congressional District
Henry B. Gonzalez, J.D. 1943, Former U.S. Representative for Texas's 20th Congressional District; Former Chairman of the House Committee on Financial Services
Michael McCaul, J.D. 1987, U.S. Representative for Texas's 10th Congressional District; Chairman of the House Committee on Homeland Security
 Scott McInnis, J.D. 1980, Former U.S. Representative from Colorado's 3rd congressional district
 Walter Thomas Price IV, J.D., Texas State Representative for Texas's 87th House District
Stuart Bowen, J.D. 1991, Special Inspector General for Iraq Reconstruction
Tom Corbett, J.D. 1975, 46th Governor of Pennsylvania (2011–2015), 46th Attorney General of Pennsylvania (2005–2011), Former U.S. Attorney for the Western District of Pennsylvania
Peter Kinder, J.D. 1979, 46th Lieutenant Governor of Missouri
Rolando Pablos, J.D. 1998, 111th Texas Secretary of State
Pete Saenz, J. D., Mayor of Laredo, Texas since November 12, 2014
Eddie Morales, J. D. 2000, Texas State Representative

Other 
Hayden C. Covington, J.D. 1933, Legal Counsel for the Watch Tower Bible and Tract Society of Pennsylvania (has argued many cases Before the U.S. Supreme Court)
Charles Fincher, J.D. 1971, American cartoonist ("Thadeus & Weez")
 Mario G. Obledo, LL.B. 1960, co-founder of the Mexican American Legal Defense and Education Fund
Chris Marrou, J.D. 2007, former news anchor for KENS-TV

References 

St. Mary's University School of Law alumni
St. Mary's University, Texas